Coronididae is a family of crustaceans belonging to the order Stomatopoda.

Genera:
 Acoridon Adkison, Heard & Hopkins, 1983
 Coronida Brooks, 1886
 Mortensenenus Manning, 1990
 Neocoronida Manning, 1976
 Paracoridon Moosa, 1991

References

Crustaceans